Lisboa e Vale do Tejo was one of the five regions of Portugal (NUTS II subdivisions). Today two of the subregions are in the new Lisboa Region, two in the Centro Region and one in the Alentejo Region.

The region still exists as the area of intervention of the CDDR planning region.

It had 3,447,173 inhabitants (2001), and its area was 11,930 km².

NUTS II region and area of intervention of the CCDR-LVT

"Despite the territorial configuration for statistical purposes (National Statistical System in Portugal), in force since 2007, matching the NUTS II the Lisbon, Region Greater Lisbon (AML) - composed only NUTSIII Greater Lisbon and Setúbal Peninsula - the area of intervention of the CCDRLVT - Steering Committee and Regional Development, abbreviated to CCDR - (the Lisbon and the Tagus Valley), continues to be composed of 5 NUTSIII (Sub-regions: Greater Lisbon, Setúbal Peninsula, Middle Tagus, and Lezíria West Coast). 

For the Regional Funds, management responsibilities under the policy of the European Union in Portugal, this regions it's the region of Lisbon that consists of Grande Lisboa and Península de Setúbal, for regional planning (Run, monitor and evaluate, at regional level, policies on environment, nature conservation, land management and city) the region is called Lisbon and the Tagus Valley (LVT), composed by 5 NUTSIII (Sub-regions: Greater Lisbon, Setúbal Peninsula, Middle Tagus, and Lezíria West Coast)." (Talk:Lisboa Region)

Sub-regions

The region includes five sub-regions (NUTS III subdivisions):
 Grande Lisboa
 Lezíria do Tejo
 Oeste
 Península de Setúbal

About NUTS II only: since 2002, the subregion Lezíria do Tejo was reinstated to the Alentejo Region and Oeste were reinstated to the Centro Region.  The region changed the name from Lisboa e Vale do Tejo to Lisboa, its current designation.

Other subdivisions
The five subregions together contain 51 municipalities, which have a combined total of 525 parishes.

External links
 Comissão de Coordenação e Desenvolvimento Regional de Lisboa e Vale do Tejo  — Coordination Commission of Lisbon and Tagus Valley Region

Regions of Portugal
Geography of Lisbon
History of Lisbon